This is a list of films set in Australia (and not just only filmed or created in Australia):

0–9
 2:37 (2006)
 48 Shades (2006)
 100 Bloody Acres (2012)
 $9.99 (2008)

A
 Aadavari Matalaku Arthale Verule (2007)
 ABBA: The Movie (2007)
 Adam's Woman (1970)
 The Adventures of Priscilla, Queen of the Desert (1994)
 After the Deluge (2003)
 Age of Consent (1969)
 Alex & Eve (2016)
 Alexandra's Project (2003)
 Alvin Purple (1973)
 Alvin Rides Again (1974)
 Amy (1997)
 Animal Kingdom (2010)
 Annie's Coming Out (1984)
 Any Questions for Ben? (2012)
 Aquamarine (2006)
 Around the Boree Log (1925)
 As Time Goes By (1988)
 Australia (1989)
 Australia (2008)
 Australian Rules (2002)

B
 The Babadook (2014)
 Bachna Ae Haseeno (2008)
 The Back of Beyond (1954)
 Back of Beyond (1995)
 Back to the Outback (2021]
 Bad Behaviour (2010)
 Bad Boy Bubby (1993)
 Bad Eggs (2003)
 The BBQ (2018)
 Beaconsfield (2012)
 Beautiful (2009)
 Beneath Clouds (2002)
 Big Ideas (1993)
 The Big Steal (1990)
 Bigger Than Tina (1999)
 The Birth of White Australia (1928)
 Black and White (2002)
 The Black Balloon (2008)
 Black Water (2007)
 Blackrock (1997)
 Blame (2011)
 Bleeding Steel (2017)
 Blinky Bill (1992)
 Blinky Bill the Movie (2015)
 Bliss (1985)
 Blue Fin (1978)
 Blurred (2002)
 BMX Bandits (1983)
 Body Melt (1993)
 Bondi Tsunami (2004)
 Bootmen (2000)
 The Boys (1998)
 Bran Nue Dae (2009)
 Break Ke Baad (2010)
 Buckley's Chance (2021)
 Burning Man (2011)
 Butterfly Island (1985)

C
 Cactus (1986 drama) by Paul Cox
 Cactus (2008 road movie) 
 Caddie (1976)
 Candy (2006)
 Careful, He Might Hear You (1983)
 The Cars That Ate Paris (1974)
 The Castle (1997)
 Chak De India (2007)
 The Chant of Jimmie Blacksmith (1972)
 Charlie and Boots (2009)
 Children of the Revolution (1996)
 Chopper (2000)
 City of the Damned
 Closed for Winter (2009)
 Clubland (2007)
 The Coca-Cola Kid (1985)
 The Coolangatta Gold (1984)
 Cosi (1996)
 The Cowra Breakout (1985)
 Crackerjack (2002)
 Crackers (1998)
 The Craic (1999)
 Crawl (2011)
 Crimes at the Dark House (1940)
 Crocodile Dundee (1986)
 Crocodile Dundee II (1988)
 Crocodile Dundee in Los Angeles (2001)
 The Crocodile Hunter: Collision Course (2002)
 Crook (2010)
 The Crop (2004)
 The Crossing (1990)

D
 Dad and Dave: On Our Selection (1995)
 Danny Deckchair (2003)
 Dating the Enemy (1996)
 Dawn! (1979)
 Daybreakers (2009)
 Dead End Drive-In (1986)
 Dead Letter Office (1998)
 Death in Brunswick (1990)
 Death of a Soldier (1986)
 December Boys (2007)
 Deck Dogz (2005)
 The Delinquents (1989)
 Dil Chahta Hai (2001)
 Dimboola (1979)
 Dingo (1991)
 Dirty Deeds (2002)
 The Dish (2000)
 Dogs in Space (1986)
 Doing Time for Patsy Cline (1997)
 Don's Party (1971)
 Double Happiness Uranium (2013) article deleted as not notable
 The Dressmaker (2015)
 Drive Hard (2014)
 The Drover's Boy (never completed)
 The Drover's Wife: The Legend of Molly Johnson (2021)
 Dying Breed (2008)

E
 Eliza Fraser
 Erskineville Kings (1999)
 Eucalyptus
 The Everlasting Secret Family (1988)
 Evil Angels (aka A Cry in the Dark) (1988)
 The Extra (2005)

F
 Fat Pizza (2003)
 Fat Pizza vs. Housos (2014)
 Fatty Finn (1980)
 FernGully: The Last Rainforest (1992)
 FernGully 2: The Magical Rescue (1998)
 A Few Best Men (2011)
 Finding Nemo (2003)
 The Finished People (2003)
 The FJ Holden (1977)
 Flirting (1991)
 Footy Legends (2006)
 Fortress (1986)
 Forty Thousand Horsemen (1940)
 Frog Dreaming (aka The Quest, The Go-Kids) (1986)

G
 Gallipoli (1981)
 Garage Days (2002)
 Geordie (1955)
 Gettin' Square (2003)
 The Getting of Wisdom (1977)
 Ginger Meggs (1982)
 A Girl in Australia (aka Bello onesto emigrato Australia sposerebbe compaesana illibata) (1971)
 The Goddess of 1967 (2000)

H
 Happy Feet (briefly) (2006)
 The Hard Word (2002)
 Harvie Krumpet (2003)
 Hating Alison Ashley (2005)
 He Died with a Felafel in His Hand (2001)
 Head On (1998)
 The Heartbreak Kid (1993)
 Heatwave (1982)
 Heaven's Burning (1997)
 Heyy Babyy (2007)
 Hollywood (2002)
 Holy Smoke! (1999)
 The Honourable Wally Norman (2003)
 The Horseman (2008)
 Housos vs. Authority (2012)
 Howling III (1987)

I
 I Love You Too (2001 film)
 The Inbetweeners 2 (2014)
 The Incredible Journey of Mary Bryant  (TV miniseries)
 Indian (1996 film)
 Independence Day (1996)

J
 Jackie Chan's First Strike (1996) (aka Police Story 4: First Strike)
 Jaggubhai (2010)
 Japanese Story (2003)
 Jasper Jones (2017)
 Jedda (1955)
 Jindabyne (2006)
 Joffa: The Movie (2010)

K
 Kangaroo Jack (2003)
 Kath & Kim:
 Da Kath & Kim Code (TV movie) (2005)
 Kath & Kimderella (2012)
 Keith (2008)
 Kenny (2006)
 The Kid Stakes (1927)

L
 Lantana (2001)
 Last Cab to Darwin (2015)
 The Last Confession of Alexander Pearce (2009 film)
 The Last Days of Chez Nous (1992)
 The Last of the Knucklemen (1979)
 The Last Trackers of the Outback (2007 documentary film)
 Last Train to Freo (2006)
 The Last Wave (1977)
 Let's Get Skase (2001)
 Lion (2016)
 A Little Bit of Soul (1998)
The Little Death (2014)
 Little Fish (2005)
 Long Weekend (1978)
 Long Weekend (2008)
 Look Both Ways (2005)
 Looking for Alibrandi (2000)
 Love and Other Catastrophes (1996)
 Love Me Again (2009 Filipino film)
 Love Serenade (1996)
 The Loved Ones (2009)
 Love's Brother (2004)

M
 Mad Max (1979)
 Mad Max 2 (1981)
 Mad Max Beyond Thunderdome (1985)
 Mad Max: Fury Road (2015)
 The Magic Pudding (2000)
 Malcolm (1986)
 The Man from Down Under (1943)
 The Man from Hong Kong (1975)
 The Man from Snowy River (1920)
 The Man from Snowy River (1982)
 The Man from Snowy River II (1988) (aka Return to Snowy River (US), and The Untamed (UK))
 Man of Flowers (1983)
 The Man Who Sued God (2001)
 The Mango Tree (1977)
 Marking Time (2003)
 Mary and Max (2009)
 Melodrama/Random/Melbourne (2018)
 Mental (2012)
 A Million (2009)
 Mission: Impossible 2 (2000)
 Mountains May Depart (2015)
 Mr. Accident (2000)
 Mr. Nice Guy (1997)
 Mr. Perfect (2011)
 Mr. Reliable (1996)
 A Month of Sundays (2015)
 Muriel's Wedding (1994)
 My Brilliant Career (1979)
 My Brother Jack (1964)
 My Mother Frank (2000)

N
 Nala Damayanthi (2003)
 Napoleon (1995)
 Ned Kelly (1970)
 Ned Kelly (2003)
 Never Tell Me Never (1998)
 Newcastle (2008)
 Newsfront (1978)
 The Night We Called It a Day (2003)
 The Night the Prowler (1978)
 The Nightingale (2018)
 Noise (2007)
 The Nostradamus Kid (1992)
 The Nugget (2002)

O
 The Odd Angry Shot (1979)
 Oddball (2015)
 Offside (2009) article deleted as not notable
 On the Beach (1959)
 One Night the Moon (2001)
 One Perfect Day (2004)
 Opal Dream (2006)
 Orange (2010)
 Oranges and Sunshine (2010)
 Oscar and Lucinda (1997)
 Our Lips Are Sealed (2000)
 The Overlanders (1946)
 Oyster Farmer (2004)

P
 Palm Beach (2019)
 Paperback Hero (1999)
 Paper Planes (2015)
 Patrick (1978)
 Patrick (2013)
 Peaches (2004)
 Peter Allen: Not the Boy Next Door (2015 miniseries)
 Picnic at Hanging Rock (1975)
 The Picture Show Man (1977)
 Playing Beatie Bow (1986)
 The Plumber (1979)
 Primal (2010)
 Proof (1991)
 The Proposition (2005)
 Puberty Blues (1981)

Q
 Quigley Down Under (1990)

R
 Raajakumara (2017)
 Rabbit-Proof Fence (2002)
 Race the Sun (1996)
 Radiance (1998)
 The Rage in Placid Lake (2003)
 Razorback (1984)
 Reckless Kelly (1993)
 Red Dog (2011)
 Red Hill (2010)
 The Reef (2010)
 The Reef: Stalked (2022)
 The Rescuers Down Under (1990)
 Return Home (1990)
 Ride Like a Girl (2019)
 Rikky and Pete (1988)
 Road to Nhill (1997)
 Roadgames (1981)
 Rogue (2007)
 Romper Stomper (1992)
 The Rover (2014)
 Running on Empty (1982)

S
 Sabrina, Down Under (1999 telemovie)
 Salaam Namaste (2005)
 Salt Bridge (2015)
 Sankham (2009)
 Saving Mr. Banks (2013)
 Scooby-Doo! and the Legend of the Vampire (2002)
 Secret Bridesmaids' Business (2019 miniseries)
 The Sentimental Bloke (1919)
 Sheborg Massacre (2016)
 Shame (1988)
 Shine (1996)
 Siam Sunset (1999)
 The Siege of Pinchgut (1959)
 Silent Partner (2001)
 The Silver Brumby (1993)
 Singh Is Kinng (2008)
 Sirens (1994)
 Sister Kenny (1946)
 Sleeping Beauty (2011)
 Smiley (1956)
 Smiley Gets a Gun (1958)
 Soldier (1998)
 Solo (2006)
 Somersault (2004)
 The Sound of One Hand Clapping (1998)
 South Solitary (2010)
 La Spagnola (2001)
 Spider and Rose (1994)
 Spotswood (1992)
 The Square (2008)
 Squizzy Taylor (1982)
 Stone (1974)
 Stork (1971)
 Storm Boy (1976)
 Storm Boy (2019)
 The Story of the Kelly Gang (1906)
 Strange Bedfellows (2004)
 Strictly Ballroom (1992)
 Struck by Lightning (1990)
 Suburban Mayhem (2006)
 Summer of the Seventeenth Doll (1959)
 The Sum of Us (1994)
 Sunday Too Far Away (1975)
 The Sundowners (1960)
 Sunstruck (1972)
 Surfer, Dude (2008)

T
 Take Away (2003)
 Tank Girl (1995)
 Ten Canoes (2006)
 Thalaivaa (2013)
 Thank God He Met Lizzie (1997)
 These Final Hours (2013)
 They're a Weird Mob (1966)
 The Thorn Birds (TV miniseries)
 Those Dear Departed (1987)
 Thunderstruck (2004)
 Tim (1979)
 Tom White (2004)
 Tomorrow, When the War Began (2011)
 Top End Wedding (2019)
 Total Recall (2012)
 A Town Like Alice (TV miniseries)
 The Tracker (2002)
 Travelling Light (2003)
 Travelling North (1987)
 True Love and Chaos (1997)
 Turkey Shoot (1982)
 Turkey Shoot (2014)
 Two Hands (1999)
 Two Fists, One Heart (2009)

U
 Unbroken (2014)
 Under Capricorn (1949)
 UNindian (2015)
 Uninhabited (2010)
 Unnale Unnale (2007)

W
 Wake in Fright (1971)
 Walkabout (1971)
 Walking on Water (2002)
 The Wannabes (2003)
 We of the Never Never (1982)
 Welcome to Woop Woop (1997)
 West of Sunshine
 The Wiggles Movie (1997)
 Where the Green Ants Dream (1984)
 Winter of Our Dreams (1981)
 The Wog Boy (2000)
 Wolf Creek (2005)
 Wolf Creek 2 (2013)
 Wyrmwood (2014)

Y
 The Year My Voice Broke (1987)
 Yolngu Boy (2001)
 You and Your Stupid Mate (2005)
 You Can't Stop the Murders (2003)
 Young Einstein (1988)

See also

 List of movies based on location
 List of Australian films
 Cinema of Australia

References

Australia
 
Setting